Ferdinando Cito Filomarino (born 27 November 1986) is an Italian film director and  screenwriter.

Career
In 2010, Cito Filomarino wrote and directed Diarchy, a short film starring Louis Garrel, Riccardo Scamarcio, and Alba Rohrwacher. It screened at the Locarno Film Festival on 7 August 2010 and the Sundance Film Festival on 21 January 2011. In 2015, he made his feature film directorial debut Antonia., about poet Antonia Pozzi. Cito Filomarino also directed two short films starring Małgosia Bela, Await and Closing In.

In April 2019, it was announced Cito Filomarino would direct Beckett starring John David Washington, Alicia Vikander, Boyd Holbrook and Vicky Krieps; among the producers are Luca Guadagnino and Marco Morabito, it is based on an original story by Cito Filomarino, and the screenplay was written by Kevin Rice.

Cito Filomarino has also collaborated multiple times with director Luca Guadagnino, including serving as his second unit director on A Bigger Splash, Call Me by Your Name, and Suspiria.

Personal life
Filomarino was in a relationship with director Luca Guadagnino from 2009 to 2020.

Filmography
Feature films

Short films

Editor credits

References

External links
 

1986 births
Living people
Italian film directors
Italian male screenwriters
LGBT film directors
Italian LGBT screenwriters
Italian gay writers
Italian-language film directors
Gay screenwriters